Vasudevan Sivankutty (born 10 November 1954) is an Indian politician, currently serving as the Minister for General Education and Labour, Government of Kerala. He represents the Nemom Constituency in the 15th Kerala Legislative Assembly.

Sivankutty is a State Committee Member of the Communist Party of India (Marxist) in Kerala and the State Secretary of the Centre of Indian Trade Unions (CITU) Kerala, and the District President of CITU, Thiruvananthapuram.

Personal life
Sivankutty was born as the son of activist M. Vasudevan Pillai and P. Krishnamma, at Cheruvakkal.

Political career 
Sivankutty entered politics through the Students' Federation of India (SFI) and has held positions such as its District President, State President, District Secretary, State Secretary and All India Joint Secretary. From SFI, he joined the Centre of Indian Trade Unions (CITU), and currently holds positions such as its State Secretary and District President.

He was the President of the erstwhile Ulloor Panchayat, the Mayor of Thiruvananthapuram Corporation, the Joint Secretary of the All India Mayors’ Council, the MLA of Thiruvananthapuram East and then Nemom (2011 - 2016).

In the recently concluded Kerala Assembly Elections, he defeated BJP's Kummanam Rajasekharan and K. Muraleedharan to become the MLA of Nemom again (2021–Present). He is currently a Minister in the Pinarayi Vijayan-led LDF cabinet, handling portfolios of General Education and Labour. The other departments under him right now are Literacy Movement, Employment and Training, Skills, Rehabilitation, Factories and Boilers, Insurance Medical Service, Industrial Tribunals, and Labour Courts.

2015 Budget Presentation Ruckus 
The Assembly witnessed ugly scenes after the Opposition MLAs attempted to prevent the Finance Minister from presenting the budget. His photos were so familiar leading the protest with the cable, sound system and monitor. Sivankutty was the major leader who opposed and created panic in assembly. Other accused in the case are minister K T Jaleel, E P Jayarajan, C K Sadasivan, K Ajith and Kunhahamed Master.Violent legislators had toppled the Speaker’s chair and threw the microphones away. The House suffered damages worth 2 lakh in the incident. Charges against the accused include relevant section of Prevention of Destruction of Public Property Act and IPC sections 447 (criminal trespass) and 427 (mischief causing damage).

The government moved the court based on a letter filed by V. Sivankutty. Several others, including Opposition leader Ramesh Chennithala, had filed petition.

Personal life
He is married to women's rights activist and Kerala Public Service Commission (PSC) member R. Parvathi Devi. They have one son.

References

1954 births
Living people
Communist Party of India (Marxist) politicians from Kerala
Kerala MLAs 2006–2011
Kerala MLAs 2011–2016
Kerala MLAs 2021–2026
Politicians from Thiruvananthapuram